Hurricane Roslyn was the strongest hurricane of the 1986 Pacific hurricane season. The seventeenth and final named storm of the season, Roslyn developed on October 15 to the south of Mexico. Its movement was initially guided by a ridge to its north, and it became a tropical storm on October 16 and a hurricane a day later. Roslyn ultimately moved ashore near Mazatlán, Sinaloa as a minimal hurricane, where it caused minimal damage due to the light population affected. It rapidly dissipated, although the remnants brought precipitation to Texas and other portions of the central and southern United States. There were no fatalities, and reported damage was minor.

Meteorological history

The final named storm of the season originated from a tropical disturbance that crossed Nicaragua into the eastern Pacific Ocean. With warm waters and increasing cyclonic organization, it developed into Tropical Depression Twenty-Four on October 15 offshore Guatemala. The system moved quickly west-northwestward under the influence of a ridge over Mexico. Quickly intensifying, the depression attained tropical storm status early on October 16; it was given the name Roslyn by the Eastern Pacific Hurricane Center.

As water temperatures remained very warm along its path, the hurricane was able to intensify quickly. Roslyn maintained peak intensity for about 18 hours, during which it turned more to the northwest in response to a powerful advancing cold front. On October 20, the hurricane curved northeastward as steady weakening ensued. After bypassing southeast of the Baja California Peninsula, Hurricane Roslyn moved ashore on October 22 at Mazatlán, Sinaloa with winds of 75 mph (120 km/h). The low-level center rapidly dissipated, although the upper-level circulation continued northeastward along the advancing cold front. A frontal low developed in the western Gulf of Mexico, which moved over southeastern Texas and later through the Mississippi Valley. The original upper-level circulation maintained its northeast movement, bringing rainfall to the southeastern United States.

Preparations and impact

Prior to the hurricane's landfall in Mexico, officials in Mazatlán executed the evacuation of over 2,000 people in vulnerable coastal areas; such preparations prevented any deaths or injuries. Additionally, the owners of fishing vessels were advised to secure their properties by moving them to a safer area. As a result, only one yacht was sunk during the hurricane, and no major damage was reported by the fishing industry. Prior to moving ashore, Roslyn dropped light rainfall in extreme southern Baja California Sur. The brunt of the storm missed Mazatlán, instead affecting a sparsely-populated area. Roslyn produced some flooding, but no serious damage. Impact was limited to flooded homes and factories, as well as some crop damage and beach erosion.

The remnants of Hurricane Roslyn produced heavy rainfall across the central and southern United States. The outskirts of the remnants of Roslyn brought rainfall to areas still recovering from significant flooding, partially caused by the earlier Hurricane Paine. Clouds from Roslyn began affecting the southern United States a day before it made its original landfall. The storm prompted flash flood watches in southeastern Texas, and the resulting rainfall flooded roadways and streams.

See also

 Other storms named Roslyn
 List of Pacific hurricanes
 List of Category 4 Pacific hurricanes

References

Roslyn 1986
Roslyn
Roslyn 1986
Roslyn 1986
Roslyn